Kayla Day was the defending champion, but chose not to participate.

Amanda Anisimova won the title, defeating Coco Gauff in the final, 6–0, 6–2.

Seeds

Main draw

Finals

Top half

Section 1

Section 2

Bottom half

Section 3

Section 4

Qualifying

Seeds

Qualifiers

Draw

First qualifier

Second qualifier

Third qualifier

Fourth qualifier

Fifth qualifier

Sixth qualifier

Seventh qualifier

Eighth qualifier

External links 
 Draw

Girls' Singles
US Open, 2017 Girls' Singles